Corporate workout refers to financial rescue of a firm that is outside formal bankruptcy and insolvency law. Also known as out-of-court debt restructuring, corporate workout practices aim to remedy or avoid foreclosure and bankruptcy. The debtors, creditors as well as the main shareholder and bondholders voluntarily participate in the workouts in order to make rearrangements concerning financial investments and rescheduling and restructuring debt. As a way of response to corporate crisis, corporate workout arrangements were widely seen in the aftermath of the Asian financial crisis in 1997.

See also
Restructuring
Debt restructuring
Compromise agreement
Creditor
Debt
Insolvency
Voluntary redundancy

References

Further reading
Low, Linda. "Asian crisis, corporate and financial restructuring, and transformation of traditional Chinese enterprises." Rethinking Chinese Transnational Enterprises: Cultural Affinity and Business Strategies 7 (2002): 240.
Mako, William P. "Emerging-Market and Crisis Applications for Out-of-Court Workouts: Lessons from East Asia." Corporate Restructuring (2005): 99.

Debt
Restructuring